The Downtown Loop, also called the Alphabet Loop, is a complex layout of highways in downtown Kansas City, Missouri involving 23 exits, four Interstate Highways, four U.S. Highways and numerous city streets. Each exit in the highway loop is numbered 2 and suffixed with every letter of the alphabet except I, O, and Z (I and O look similar to 1 and 0 on the exit tabs; Z is not needed).

Description

Alphabetically, the letter suffixes begin with A in the northwest corner of the loop and proceed forward in a clockwise direction around the loop. Eastbound on the north side of the loop (EB I-70/NB I-35), one encounters A through G; then H through M southbound on the east side (EB I-70/SB US 71); then N through U westbound on the south side (WB I-670); and finally V through Y northbound on the west side (NB I-35 alone).

Interstate 70 enters the southeast corner of the loop and moves north forming the east and north sides of the loop and exiting in the northwest corner. Exits on I-70 range from 2A to 2M.

Interstate 35 enters the loop at its northeast corner, joining I-70 on the north side and forming the west side of the loop before exiting in the southwest corner. Exits on I-35 range from 2F to 2A while it overlaps I-70, and 2Y to 2U after I-70 exits the loop.

Interstate 29 does not enter the loop. It begins at the northeast corner and continues north, concurrent with I-35. These two leave the loop via the Christopher S. Bond Bridge and split several miles north.

Interstate 670 forms the south side of the loop. I-670 splits from I-70 in Kansas City, Kansas, crosses over I-70 and enters the loop in the southwest corner, rejoining I-70 and ending in Kansas City, Missouri in the southeast corner of the loop.  I-670 is also signed as Alternate I-70.

U.S. Route 71 is a highway that enters the loop in the southeast corner and leaves the loop with I-29 and I-35 in the northeast corner.

U.S. Route 24 is a major city street which enters the loop in the northeast corner and follows I-35 and I-70 along the north side of the loop. Former US 24 now US-Bus 24 is also known as Independence Ave/Blvd and provides a street-level connection to Independence, Missouri.

U.S. Route 40 overlaps I-70 throughout the northern and eastern sections of the loop.

U.S. Route 169 enters the loop in the northwest corner from the Buck O'Neil Bridge, and joins I-70, continuing westward.

Route 9 also provides access to the loop, ending at I-70 after crossing the Heart of America Bridge from North Kansas City.

History
Before the west side of the loop was built, there was a scenic road called Kersey Coates Drive in that place. There were many affluent homes that were built along the road, and stairs that led down from Case Park immediately to the east.  When the loop was completed, the multi-lane Interstate cut further into the bluff and these homes were razed.  The stairs leading down from Case Park were cut off halfway and still remain today, between exits 2W and 2X.

A March 2010 preliminary study of the Kansas City I-70 corridor made several innovative suggestions to relieve congestion in the downtown area. One proposal was to make the loop unidirectional, where the loop would essentially become a large roundabout. In 2022, plans were approved to construct a $160 million cap over a stretch of I-670, on the loops southern half. The cap would be topped with a public park and construction was scheduled to start in 2023.

Exit list
The following is the list of exits inside the loop in order as encountered if entering the loop from eastbound I-70.

Clockwise exits

Counterclockwise exits

See also
Malfunction Junction

References

Transportation in Kansas City, Missouri
Interstate 35
Interstate 70
Interstate 29
U.S. Route 24
U.S. Route 40
U.S. Route 71
U.S. Route 169
Transportation in Jackson County, Missouri